Saigon is the former name of Ho Chi Minh City, the current most populous city in Vietnam. The Sài Gòn name is still used in Vietnamese lingo.  

Saigon may also refer to:

 Saigon (mango), a seedling race of mango cultivars 
 Saigon (rapper) (born 1977), American hip hop artist
 Saigon (Grey novel), a 1982 novel by Anthony Grey
 Saigon (Killmaster novel), a 1964 Nick Carter novel
 Saigon (1948 film), a 1948 film starring Alan Ladd and Veronica Lake
 Off Limits (1988 film) or Saigon
 Saigon River, a river in Vietnam
 Bia Saigon, a beer brand of Vietnamese Sabeco Brewery

See also
 Sai Kung District, a place in Hong Kong, with the same name in Chinese
 Miss Saigon, a 1989 musical
 Saigon cinnamon (Cinnamomum loureiroi), also known as Vietnamese cinnamon